The Art Workers' Guild is an organisation established in 1884 by a group of British painters, sculptors, architects, and designers associated with the ideas of William Morris and the Arts and Crafts movement. The guild promoted the 'unity of all the arts', denying the distinction between fine and applied art. It opposed the professionalisation of architecture – which was promoted by the Royal Institute of British Architects at this time – in the belief that this would inhibit design. In his 1998 book, Introduction to Victorian Style, University of Brighton's David Crowley stated the guild was "the conscientious core of the Arts and Crafts Movement".

History
The guild was not the first organisation to promote the unity of the arts. Two organisations, the Fifteen and St George's Art Society had existed previously, and the guild's founders came from the St George's Art Society. They were five young architects from Norman Shaw's office: W. R. Lethaby, Edward Prior, Ernest Newton, Mervyn Macartney and Gerald C. Horsley, plus metal worker W. A. S. Benson, designer Heywood Sumner, painter C. H. H. Macartney, sculptors Hamo Thornycroft and Edward Onslow Ford, and the architect John Belcher. The motive for the guild's creation was the summer exhibition in 1883 at the Royal Academy of Arts, where the "mother of arts" were snubbed to two side walls in one gallery. Edward Prior wrote in November 1883, 

Others were soon invited to join, including Fifteen members Lewis Foreman Day, George Blackall Simonds and J. D. Sedding, as well as architects Somers Clarke, John Thomas Micklethwaite, W. C. Marshall, Basil Champneys; painters Herbert Gustave Schmalz, Alfred Parsons, John McLure Hamilton, William R. Symonds and etcher Theodore Blake Wirgman. The first meeting took place on 18 January 1884 at Charing Cross Hotel with Belcher as chair, and after some debate agreed they would invite others "for promoting greater intercourse among the Arts". Several names were proposed, including Guild of Art by Benson, Guild of Associated Arts, Guild of Art Workers, The Art Workers and the Society of Art Workers. Prior combined the name ideas and put forward the Art Workers' Guild and wrote the Guilds prospectus. The name and prospectus was agreed and the guild was formally created on 11 March and by its first formal annual meeting on 5 December 1884 it had grown to 56 members. The guild was based on the medieval trade guilds, with members called Brothers and its head called Master. Its first master was the sculptor, George Blackall Simonds. In 1885, Walter Crane reiterated the guild's worries to the Fabian Society, 

The guild organised talks, lectures, demonstrations and meetings to bring unity of the arts to its members including guest speakers such as Lucien Pissarro in 1891. Sir Edwin Lutyens was first invited as a guest in 1892 and recalled:  but he joined later and admired the freedom to argue passionately and:  By 1895 the guild had 195 members and included such luminaries as William Morris and Thomas Graham Jackson. At that year's annual general meeting, the elected Master Heywood Sumner declared to the members: 

This comment was confirmed in 1900 when the government recruited guild members Thomas Graham Jackson, William Blake Richmond, Edward Onslow Ford, and Walter Crane to the Council for Advice on Art, and they reorganised the Royal College of Art in line with Art Workers' Guild ideals. Under Graham Jacksons' time as Master, the Guildsmen were looking at the purpose of the guild. Many, including Morris wanted the guild to be a more active force and put forward a Councillor to the London County Council to advise on the protection of historical buildings and advocate craftsmanship. However Graham Jackson was against politics and declared the guild should not be:  Graham Jackson decided training the next generation of artists was more important and created the Art Student Guild, which would go onto become the Junior Guild. The Junior Guild was not a great success and by 1928 was confirmed by members that it had outlived its purpose. However, Masters H. M. Fletcher and Basil Oliver had come through the junior guild.

In 1902, on retiring from the Master's position, George Frampton stressed that only properly qualified candidates should be elected to the guild, and in 1905 the membership election system was amended. By this time the membership had grown to 235. Frampton had also recommended that the guild set up a benevolent fund for hard up members, which became known as the Guild Chest. However Frampton caused controversy in 1915, calling for Karl Krall, a German-born member, to have his membership revoked due to his nationality during World War I. The guild voted by a one vote majority to allow Krall to keep his membership, so Frampton resigned. Krall was so upset by the debates that led to the vote that he also resigned and asked that he never be contacted by the guild again.

During World War II the guild's income dropped considerably, however they remained solvent under the "zealous guardianship of the funds" of honorary treasurer Laurence Arthur Turner. In 1945, the War Memorial Advisory Committee asked the guild for its ideas on war memorials, to which the guild responded by deploring mass produced war memorials and advising on well designed carved inscriptions on the walls of the church cut by individual craftsmen.

The Art Workers Guild gave rise to many offshoots, including the Birmingham, Liverpool, the Northern Art Workers' Guild in Manchester, the Edinburgh Art Workers' Guild and the Junior Art Workers' Guild but the biggest was the Arts and Crafts Exhibition Society. There was even a guild set up in Philadelphia. The guild began as a male-only organisation, leading May Morris to start the Women’s Guild of Arts in 1907 as an alternative for women. In 1914 the women's guild was allowed to use the meeting hall at Queens Square, but they were not allowed to have their roll call on the walls. There was great discussion between members about letting in women with Hamilton T. Smith writing to Arthur Llewellyn Smith in 1958 stated:  In the 1959 Annual Report, it stated that it was "discussed at length but not put to the vote, it being felt that so revolutionary a proposal needed further careful discussion". Further discussions occurred over the next few years, and in 1962 past master Brian Thomas asked:  It was not until 1964 that the brothers, at a special meeting, agreed to admit women to the guild. The first women to join was the wood engraver Joan Hassall who became the first female Master in 1972. In 1949, the members of the Junior Art Workers' Guild were invited to join the guild after their organisation closed down.

In 1985, a centenary exhibition was held at the Brighton Museum and Art Gallery. In a review of the exhibition by Colin Amery in The Burlington Magazine, Amery stated that the exhibition showed "the current Guildsmen work did not have the weight and quality to carry hope of a new spring".

The guild's home

The guild held its meetings initially in rented space. Between 1884 and 1888, it used the Century Club's rooms at 6 Pall Mall Place in Pall Mall, London, from 1888 to 1894 it used Barnard's Inn, Holborn and then between 1894 to 1914 they used Clifford's Inn. In 1914, the lease on Clifford's Inn was to end and the organisation was looking for a new home. The Central School of Art and Design was offered as temporary accommodation by London County Council, with negotiations being held by F. V. Burridge, the college's principal.

However, the architects Arnold Dunbar Smith and Cecil Claude Brewer had an office in the front of the early Georgian house at 6 Queen Square, Bloomsbury and, when they heard that the freehold was for sale, encouraged the guild to buy it. The back part of the building was reconstructed as a meeting hall, designed by Francis William Troup and inaugurated on 22 April 1914. At the opening, Master Harold Speed said to his fellow Brothers that he knew they would miss,  but encouraged them to enjoy  The hall was furnished with rush-seated chairs made in Herefordshire by Philip Clissett and his grandsons between 1888 and 1914, and afterwards copied by Ernest Gimson and his successors. The Master sits in a seat designed by Lethaby and a table by Benson. The names of all members up to the year 2000 are painted on a frieze around the walls of the Hall. The list of names now continues in the front room known as the ‘Master’s Room’. In 2017 the building was modernised under the direction of Simon Hurst, the honorary architect of the guild. The building contains portraits of every Master since 1884.

The guild rents space to the British Society of Master Glass Painters at Queen Square. The top two floors are rented as an apartment to designers Ben Pentreath and Charlie McCormick.

Recent history and notable members
The guild is today a society of artists, craftsmen and designers with a common interest in the interaction, development and distribution of creative skills. Its 350 members work at the highest levels of excellence in their professions, representing over 60 creative disciplines. Their main charitable aim is to support the visual arts and crafts in any way that may be beneficial to the community. The guild continues to programme lectures and workshops for its members to promote the exchange of knowledge among art workers of all disciplines.

Current notable members include artist Chila Kumari Burman, Jane Cox, a Fellow of the Craft Potters Association and Chair of the Outreach Committee of the Art Workers Guild (who run projects across various institutions such as the V&A, Courtauld Institute, Watts Gallery and Imperial College London) and Fleur Oates, a lacemaker and embroiderer who is the artist in residence at Imperial College's vascular surgery department.

The guild was visited by Prince Charles and Camilla, the Duke and Duchess of Cornwall in 2015 as part of the London Craft Week. In 2018, the guild staged the exhibition Salon des Refusés, 30 pieces of work by RIBA’s Traditional Architecture Group that had been rejected by the Royal Academy's Piers Gough architecture room.

Past Masters of the guild

References

Further reading
 J. L. J. Masse, The Art-Workers Guild 1884–1934 Oxford: Printed for the Art-Workers' Guild at the Shakespeare Head Press, 1935.

External links
 
 
 
 The Guild Constitution
 Artworkers’ Guild History

British art
Interior design
Arts and Crafts movement
Arts organisations based in the United Kingdom
Architecture organisations based in the United Kingdom